Bernd Besenlehner (born 24 November 1986) is an Austrian footballer who plays for ASK Eggendorf.

References

Austrian footballers
Austrian Football Bundesliga players
1986 births
Living people

Association football midfielders
SC Wiener Neustadt players